Abderraouf Ben Samir (born 29 December 1953) is a Tunisian handball player. He competed at the 1972 Summer Olympics and the 1976 Summer Olympics.

References

External links
 

1953 births
Living people
Tunisian male handball players
Olympic handball players of Tunisia
Handball players at the 1972 Summer Olympics
Handball players at the 1976 Summer Olympics
Place of birth missing (living people)